Podagrica is a genus of skeletonising flea beetles belonging to the family Chrysomelidae. There are some 55 species in the Palaearctic, Oriental, and Afrotropical regions.

Selected species
 Podagrica atlantica  Heikertinger, 1951 
 Podagrica audisioi  Biondi, 1982 
 Podagrica fuscicornis  (Linnaeus, 1766) 
 Podagrica fuscipes  (Fabricius, 1775) 
 Podagrica malvae  (Illiger, 1807) 
 Podagrica menetriesi  (Faldermann, 1837) 
 Podagrica pallidicolor  Pic, 1909

References

 Biolib
 Biol.uni

Alticini
Chrysomelidae genera
Taxa named by Louis Alexandre Auguste Chevrolat